Morten Moldskred (born 13 June 1980) is a Norwegian former professional footballer who played as a winger.

Club career

Early years
Moldskred started his career in Hødd from Ulsteinvik, where he stayed until the 2001 season when he was sold to Moss. In 2002 Moss was promoted to the Norwegian Premier League where he played in 11 games, scoring one goal. Moss were relegated the same year.

Aalesund and Haugesund
After the 2002 season Moldskred was sold to Aalesund who had been promoted to the top-flight. He played in all games, scoring 4 goals in the process, but for the second time in a row, he suffered the experience of being relegated. In 2004, he had his finest season so far in his career, notching up 15 goals in 29 appearances in Adeccoligaen, helping Aalesund to another promotion. He only managed 1 goal in 24 games the following season, going through another relegation from the elite group of clubs.

He was sold to Haugesund before the 2006 season, but suffered a cruciate ligament injury right after signing, and did not play any games.

Tromsø
Halfway through the 2006 season, Premier League side Tromsø picked him up on a three-year deal. His former coach at Aalesund, Ivar Morten Normark was coach at the time. After the injury he got while at Haugesund, it was expected that he was going to be out for the rest of the season, but amazingly he managed to make his debut on 30 July 2006. He only played three games before another injury definitely held him back for rest of the season.

After a difficult start at Tromsø I.L. with much time on the sideline and frequent injuries, Moldskred finally got his breakthrough and earned a place as forward in the regular starting line-up in the summer of 2007. After the departure of veteran and club-legend Ole Martin Årst in a mid-season transfer to Start. Moldskred finished the season in style and ended up the club top-scorer with 12 goals, including three in the final game of the season against the champions Brann.

Another injury set him back a bit during pre season in 2008, but after a slow start, he ended up scoring 10 goals in 21 games, helping Tromsø to a surprising bronze medal in the league.

Rosenborg
On 7 January 2010, Rosenborg and Tromsø came to agreement over a transfer fee and Moldskred signed under for Norwegian powerhouse Rosenborg a few days later.

Moldskred scored his first goal for Rosenborg on 13 May 2010 in the first round of the Norwegian Football Cup against 3rd division side Stjørdals/Blink.

He scored his first league goal for Rosenborg on 25 July 2010 against Stabæk in a 2–1 victory for Rosenborg, scoring the winner goal in injury time at Telenor Arena.

AGF
On 26 January, 2012 Moldskred signed with the Danish club AGF Århus.

Tromsø
On 31 January 2013, he signed with Tromsø IL.

Retirement
Moldskred announced his retirement from professional football on 17 February 2016, at age 35. He joined lower league club Finnsnes in May 2016. He left the team in November where he began playing futsal for local Tromsø club Berserk.

International career
Moldskred made his international debut for Norway on 5 September 2009, when he was substituted in for Thorstein Helstad in the 2010 World Cup qualifier away to Iceland. His first international goal came in his fifth match, a friendly away to Slovakia, where he scored the lone goal securing Norway their fourth consecutive win, and sixth match in a row without a loss.

Career statistics

International goals

Honours

Club
Rosenborg
Norwegian Premier League Championship: 2010

References

External links
 Morten Moldskred profile at til.no 

1980 births
Living people
Sportspeople from Møre og Romsdal
Association football wingers
Norwegian footballers
Norway international footballers
IL Hødd players
Moss FK players
Aalesunds FK players
FK Haugesund players
Tromsø IL players
Rosenborg BK players
Aarhus Gymnastikforening players
Eliteserien players
Danish Superliga players
Norwegian First Division players
Norwegian Second Division players
Norwegian expatriate footballers
Expatriate men's footballers in Denmark
Norwegian expatriate sportspeople in Denmark